The green ticket roundup, also known as the green card roundup, took place on 14 May 1941 during the Nazi occupation of France. The mass arrest started a day after French Police delivered a green card to 6694 foreign Jews living in Paris, instructing them to report for a "status check".

Over half reported as instructed, most of them Polish and Czech. They were arrested and deported to one of two transit camps in France. Most of them were interned for a year before getting deported to Auschwitz and killed.
The Green ticket roundup was the first mass arrest of Jews by the Vichy Regime during World War Two; it was followed just over a year later by the Vel' d'Hiv Roundup when over 13,000 Jews were deported and murdered.

Background 
France fell in World War II to the German invasion which began in May 1940 and ended with the occupation of Paris on June 14 and capitulation to Germany eight days later. France was occupied by Nazi Germany and divided in two, with the north and west (including Paris) belonging to the Occupied zone administered directly by Germany, and the rest to the so-called Zone libre ("Free zone") in the south and east. On July 10, parliament dissolved itself, ending the Third Republic and creating the "French State" (more commonly known as the "Vichy regime") in its place with Petain holding supreme power.

Starting in 1940, the Vichy government adopted laws that excluded Jews and their children from certain roles in society, these laws were passed without coercion from the Germans, according to Marshal Philippe Pétain's chief of staff, "Germany was not at the origin of the anti-Jewish legislation of Vichy, that legislation was spontaneous and autonomous". 
On 22 July 1940, Vichy set up a special commission to examine and revoke the citizenship of Jews who had been naturalised after the 1927 reform of the nationality law, with the aim of removing "foreigners" from French society. Roughly three hundred thousand Jews lived in France, of whom nearly half were foreign Jews who had fled since World War I from Eastern Europe and, more recently, from Nazi Germany. In September 1940, the French authorities, by order of the Germans, performed a census of foreign Jews, on 3 September 1940 it became legal to arrest and imprison all dangerous foreigners for the sake of national security and public order. SS-Hauptsturmführer Theodor Dannecker, representative of Adolf Eichmann in Paris, wished to speed up the exclusion of Jews, not only by registering them and plundering their goods, but also by interning them. He counted on Karl Theo Zeitschel at the German embassy in Paris, who shared the same objectives, and who was in charge  of relations with the Commissariat-General for Jewish Affairs, which was created on 29 March 1941.

Prelude

On 4 October, the Vichy regime promulgated a new law on the status of Jews, it became legal for local authorities to arrest foreign Jews and intern them in special camps. , the German Consul General in Paris wrote in a report to Berlin that: "The French government has undertaken to send all foreign-born Jews to concentration camps in the Unoccupied Zone," and continued that "Jews will be arrested in the Occupied Zone the moment the necessary camps are ready." 

By 1941, the camps at Pithiviers, Beaune-la-Roland, Compiegne, and Drancy were in operation, chiefly for the purpose of interning foreign Jews from Paris. On 22 April 1941, Dannecker informed prefect Jean-Pierre Ingrand, representative of the Ministry of the Interior in the Occupied zone, of the transformation of the German camp for French prisoners of war of Pithiviers into an internment camp for Parisian Jews, with the transfer of its management to the office of the Loiret prefect. At the same time, the Germans insisted on the implementation of the law of 4 October 1940 which allowed the internment of foreign Jews. The camp at Pithiviers being insufficient for the purpose on its own, the Beaune-la-Rolande internment camp was added for a maximum total capacity of 5,000 detainees.

Operations

Summons
At the beginning of May 1941, on the basis of the previous year census, 6694 foreign Jews, mostly Polish males between 18 and 60 years old living in the Paris region, received a summons on a green card (the ) hand-delivered by a French policeman for a "status review" (" on the order of Dr. Werner Best. The green cards ordered them to go to one of five centres (Caserne Napoléon, Caserne des Minimes, Rue Edouard-Pailleron, rue de la Grange aux Belles or gymnase Japy) on 14 May 1941, accompanied by a relative or a friend.

The card read:

Arrests and internment

Assuming that it was only an administrative formality, 3,700 men obeyed the summon (3 430 Polish, 157 Czech and 123 Stateless jews), they were immediately arrested while the person accompanying them was given a list of items to go fetch for them (blanket and sheet, clothing, cutlery, plate, toiletry bag, food card and enough food for 24 hours). The prisoners were transferred by bus to the Gare d’Austerlitz and deported the same day by four special trains to two transit and internment camps in the Loiret department: 1,700 in Pithiviers and 2,000 in Beaune-la-Rolande. Both camps were at first operated by French gendarmes under the administrative supervision of the Loiret prefect, the French Red Cross brought aid to the families of those interned in both camps.

The inmates at Beaune-la-Rolande stayed in the Château d’Eau barracks, the camp was located in the Southern Zone, 89 kilometers (55 miles) south of Paris. The camp had two sections: one for the internees and the other reserved for the administrative services (police station, infirmary, administration, and kitchen). It was a French-run transit and internment camp and deportation centre for Jews closely associated with the camp at Pithiviers. For more than a year the prisoners were held without knowing what would happen to them. While in Beaune-la-Rolande prisoners performed forced labor both inside and outside the camp, 700 managed to escape. The German authorities took over operations at Beaune-la- Rolande in May 1942. 

The camp at Pithiviers consisted of 19 barracks, while under French control German SS exercised supervisory control and inspection. Just like in Beaune-la-Rolande prisoners performed forced labor both inside and outside the camp. Some prisoners refused to participate in forced labor and organized a revolt in June 1941, a few managed to escape. The camp authorities responded by banning mail and sending some men to prison. The camp’s head doctor, a French doctor from the town, was removed by the SS after they found him to be sympathetic to the prisoners’ plight, under orders from Dannecker, the Germans took over operations at Pithiviers in May 1942.

Deportation and death

On 8 May 1942, 289 Jewish prisoners were transferred to the Frontstalag of Royallieu, in Compiègne, where they left in rail cattle cars on 5 June on Convoy 2 for Auschwitz concentration camp. On 25 June and 17 July 1942 the remaining prisoners were sent on Convoy 4 and Convoy 6 from the Pithiviers station, and on 28 June on Convoy 5 from the Beaune-la-Rolande station, to Auschwitz where they were murdered.

Aftermath

The Green ticket roundup was the first mass round-up of Jewish people by the Vichy Regime, it was followed a year later with the deportation and murder of more than 13,000 Jewish people during the Vel' d'Hiv Roundup.

Notes

See also 
 Maurice Papon
 History of the Jews in France
 Internment camps in France
 The Holocaust in France
 Vichy Holocaust collaboration timeline

References

Sources 
  
  
  
 
 
 
 
 
 
  
 
  
 
 
 
 </ref>

Further reading

External links

 Photos of the Green ticket roundup at the Memorial de la Shoah.

The Holocaust in France
1941 in France
May 1941 events
Antisemitism in France
Jewish French history
Vichy France